Jullien is a French surname. Notable people with the surname include:

André Jullien (1766–1832), French vintner
André-Damien-Ferdinand Jullien (1882–1964), French cardinal
Bernard Jullien (1798–1881), French linguist and academic
Christopher Jullien (born 1993), French footballer
François Jullien (born 1951), French Sinologist
Frédéric Benoît Victoire Jullien (1785–1825), French cavalry officer
Gilles Jullien (c.1651/53–1703), French Baroque composer and organist
Huguette Jullien, French curler
Jacques Jullien (1929–2012), French Roman Catholic archbishop
Jos Jullien (1877–1956), French painter
Louis Antoine Jullien (1812–1860), French conductor and composer of light music
Marc-Antoine Jullien de Paris (called Jullien fils), French revolutionary
Thomas Prosper Jullien (1773–1798), French army officer

See also
Julienne (disambiguation)
Louis Joseph Victor Jullien de Bidon (1764–1839), French army officer and nobleman
Jullien's Golden Carp or Probarbus jullieni, a species of freshwater fish

French-language surnames